Tandem Money is a company that owns Tandem Bank, one of the UK's original challenger banks. Tandem Bank is a digital bank with a mobile app, and no branches, with a mission to be the UK's greener digital bank.

The acquisition of Harrods Bank in 2017, allowed the company to provide services using the former's banking licence. Tandem Bank Limited is authorised by the Prudential Regulation Authority and regulated by the Financial Conduct Authority.

Tandem has offices across the UK in Blackpool, Cardiff, Durham, London and Manchester, employing over 500 people.

History 
The company was founded by Ricky Knox, Matt Cooper and Michael Kent in 2014. In December 2016, Tandem announced that it had secured a £35 million investment from The Sanpower Group, the Chinese company that also owned the department store House of Fraser; however, £29 million of this investment was later revoked by Sanpower over concerns that the Chinese Government would object to the investment following increased restrictions on outbound investment in China. This resulted in a delay in the launch of Tandem's savings products, which, at the time of the revocation, was expected imminently and, more importantly, meant that Tandem volunteered the return of their banking license but retained all other permissions.

In August 2017, it was announced that Tandem would fully acquire Harrods Bank, founded in 1893, in a deal that would bring a near-£200m loan book, over £300m of deposits and nearly £80 million of capital.

Prior to its sale to Tandem Money, Harrods Bank catered for high-net-worth (HNW) individuals and operated from the Harrods store in Knightsbridge, London. It offered a variety of personal and business current and savings accounts, mortgages, foreign currency and gold bullion trading services.

On 7 August 2017, Tandem Money Limited announced a deal to acquire 100% of Harrods Bank Limited shares. The purchase deal closed successfully on 11 January 2018.

In March 2018, Tandem agreed to acquire Pariti Technologies Limited, developers of the Pariti money management application.

In August 2020 Tandem acquired green home improvement loan specialists Allium Lending Group, supporting its aim to become the UK's first green digital bank.

It was announced on 8 February 2021 that Tandem had agreed to purchase the mortgage book from private bank Bank and Clients, consisting of 300 B&C customers for an undisclosed amount.

In January 2022 Tandem Bank acquired consumer lender Oplo, creating a combined business with £1.2 billion of total assets.

In November 2022 the bank launched its new Tandem Marketplace, providing information and resources to help promote greener living.

Features 
Tandem bank offers customers Savings, Mortgages, Personal and Secured Loans, Green Home Improvement Loans and Motor Finance.

See also 

 Financial technology

References

External links 
 

Banks of the United Kingdom
Online banks
Financial services companies based in London
Banks established in 1893
1893 establishments in England
Financial services companies of the United Kingdom
Financial services companies established in 2015
Mobile applications